Natalie Marie Grinham (born 16 March 1978 in Toowoomba, Queensland, Australia) is an Australian professional squash player. During her career, she has won three Commonwealth Games Gold Medals, and finished runner-up at both the World Open and the British Open. She reached the World No. 2 ranking in 2007. She represented Australia in international squash competitions up to 2006. She is married to the Dutch squash player Tommy Berden, and took up Dutch citizenship in February 2008. Both Tommy and Natalie became the first husband and wife team to win a joint championship in squash after winning the respective trophies at the inaugural edition of the Tranzparanz Open in June 2006 which was held in Almere, Netherlands.

Natalie's older sister Rachael Grinham is also one of the world's leading professional squash players.

Squash career 
Natalie's most significant tournament victory to date came at the 2006 Commonwealth Games, where she represented Australia. She defeated World No. 1 Nicol David in the semi-finals, before going on to beat her sister Rachael in the women's singles final 2–9, 9–6, 9–1, 9–6 to claim the gold medal. She then went on to claim two more gold medals in the doubles competitions – partnering Rachael in the women's doubles, and Joe Kneipp in the mixed doubles. Natalie and Rachael had previously won a women's doubles bronze medal at the 2002 Commonwealth Games. The sisters also won the women's doubles title at the 2004 World Doubles Squash Championships.

Natalie has finished runner-up at the World Open three times. In 2004, she lost in the final to Vanessa Atkinson 9–1, 9–1, 9–5; in 2006 she lost to Nicol David 1–9, 9–7, 3–9, 9–5, 9–2; and in 2007 she lost to sister Rachael 9–4, 10–8, 9–2. She was runner-up at the British Open in 2005, losing in the final to Nicol David 9–6, 9–7, 9–6.

Natalie is married to the Dutch squash player Tommy Berden and has lived in the Netherlands since 1999. She became a Dutch citizen in February 2008. She last represented Australia at the 2006 Commonwealth Games. Under the World Squash Federation's current rules, players must wait for three years before becoming eligible to represent a different country. Accordingly, she has represented the Netherlands from 2009 onwards.

Natalie gave birth to her first child in May 2010. She however made a quick comeback to the game winning the Women's Atwater Cup in Canada, upsetting third seed Joelle King in the final of the WISPA World Tour Silver 20 event in March 2011, less than a year after the birth of her son.

World Open

Finals: 4 (0 title, 4 runner-up)

Major World Series final appearances

British Open: 1 finals (0 title, 1 runner-up)

Hong Kong Open: 1 final (0 title, 1 runner-up)

Qatar Classic: 2 finals (0 title, 2 runner-up)

Malaysian Open: 1 final (0 title, 1 runner-up)

Rivalries

Natalie vs. Nicol David

Natalie Grinham and Nicol David have a long rivalry history. They have met 30 times during their careers, with Nicol leading their overall head-to-head series 23–7. Nicol is Natalie's most frequent opponent on tour. 16 of their matches have been in tournament finals, including two in the World Open tournament. The World Open 2006 final between Natalie and Nicol is dubbed to be one of the greatest in the Women's World Open history.

See also
 Official Women's Squash World Ranking

References

External links 

 
 
 

1978 births
Living people
Dutch female squash players
Australian female squash players
Commonwealth Games gold medallists for Australia
Commonwealth Games bronze medallists for Australia
Commonwealth Games medallists in squash
Squash players at the 2006 Commonwealth Games
World Games silver medalists
Competitors at the 2009 World Games
Competitors at the 2013 World Games
Sportspeople from Toowoomba
World Games medalists in squash
Medallists at the 2002 Commonwealth Games
Medallists at the 2006 Commonwealth Games